Sphaerocarpos texanus, the Texas balloonwort, is a species of liverwort in the Sphaerocarpaceae family, found in the Americas, northern Africa and Europe.

Description 
Sphaerocarpos texanus are small, thalloid, dioecious liverworts. The species is sexually dimorphic, with male plants usually 3–5 mm in diameter, females up to 12 mm in diameter. Both male (bearing antheridia) and female (bearing archegonia) plants are bright green, with the thallus branching up to several times. The plant is a winter annual, appearing in autumn and dying in spring. Notably, the spores occur in sets of four, called tetrads. Unlike most other species of liverwort, the spores stay in these tetrads until they germinate.

Habitat 
The plant is found on flat, lightly shaded soil. Usually by roadsides.

Distribution 
Sphaerocarpos texanus has a wide range, probably the widest of any species in its genus. It has been found on several continents, in the United States, Uruguay, England, Germany, France and Morocco.

References

External links 

Sphaerocarpales
Flora of the United States
Flora of Uruguay
Flora of Great Britain
Flora of France
Flora of Germany
Flora of Morocco